C-class corvette may refer to vessels of the Victorian Royal Navy:

 , a nine-ship class launched between 1876 and 1879
 , a two-vessel class of 1883–84

See also
 C class (disambiguation)